Chicecream is a Chinese premium ice cream company, known for its high prices and for being a home-grown Chinese luxury ice cream company as opposed to a Western import. Founded in 2018 in Shanghai, the company has focused on e-commerce and has become one of China's top-selling ice cream brands, growing in popularity partly with the help of Internet celebrities in the Wanghong economy.

Brand identity

Chicecream is known for its high prices and is nicknamed the "Hermes of ice cream". As of 2021, its ice cream bars usually sell for about 13–18 RMB each, though a particularly expensive cocoa powder popsicle called "Ecuador Pink" sells for 66 RMB. In contrast, most other ice cream brands in China sell for 2–8 RMB each. CEO and founder Lin Sheng attributes the company's high prices to the high cost of imported ingredients such as yuzu. 

The company's brand identity relies on its status as a homegrown Chinese luxury ice cream company, in contrast to imported Western brands like Häagen-Dazs and Magnum.

The company advertises its products as healthy, saying that they are all-natural and low in sugar and fat.

Data from e-commerce platforms indicates that Chicecream's main demographic is young people age 26–37, especially women, followed by young people age 18–25.

History

Chicecream was founded in Shanghai on 14 March 2018. The founder and CEO Lin Sheng is an entrepreneur who previously worked in advertising. The company's first six products were introduced on 20 May 2018. The company is a pioneer in the domestic premium ice cream industry in China: in the past, only foreign ice cream brands like Häagen-Dazs were seen as high-end, while domestic brands such as Mengniu and Yili were seen as lower-end.

Chicecream focused on online sales rather than sales in physical stores, and worked to get internet celebrities to promote its products. One popular blogger, Li Jiaqi, recommended Chicecream in 2020. The brand grew rapidly in popularity and at one point became the most-searched product on Xiaohongshu.

In 2019, Chicecream was fined by regulators in Shanghai for deceptive advertising. The company's advertisements falsely said that the ice cream did not contain any water and that it was made using imported Japanese tea leaves, among other inaccurate claims.

In 2020, the company was affected by the COVID-19 pandemic. According to brand manager Huang Ying, Chicecream's aged Irish cheese ice cream was unavailable for months because the cheese could not be imported due to COVID-related shipping disruption. However, Huang also said that the pandemic was good for sales, due to the increased popularity of online shopping.

In May 2021, Chicecream raised 200 million RMB in Series A financing.

In summer 2022, controversy erupted online around claims that Chicecream's products don't melt. Users speculated that the ice cream did not melt due to preservatives, coagulants, or other additives, such as carrageenan. On 5 July, a viral video showed that a salted coconut flavored Chicecream bar didn't melt even under extreme heat, leading viewers to worry about the contents of Chicecream's ice cream and whether it is safe to eat. In response, the company said that the product's physical behavior is because it contains a high concentration of solid particles and relatively little water. The company said that its products satisfy regulatory standards, including national standard GB/T 31119-2014, which regulates frozen desserts. Chicecream also said that it would cooperate in an investigation, and that it believed applying heat to ice cream was not a scientific way to test its quality.

Products

Chicecream produces more than ten flavors of ice cream, including:

 Ecuador pink (厄瓜多尔粉钻)
 Ghana black gold (加纳黑金)
 Hand-crafted jasmine (手煮茉莉)
 Aged Irish cheese (爱尔兰陈年干酪)
 Salted coconut (海盐椰椰)
 Semi-opportunism (半巧主义)
 Velvet cocoa (丝绒可可)

Chicecream ice cream bars resemble the shape of a Chinese roof tile, and the top of each bar is shaped like the Chinese character 回 ("return").

In collaboration with skincare company Xiaoxiandun (小仙炖), Chicecream introduced an ice cream product made with birds' nests, which are traditionally believed to be good for the skin.

Outside of frozen desserts, Chicecream also sells other products, including high-end dumplings and cakes.

Stores

Though the company has focused primarily on e-commerce, it also has brick-and-mortar stores in cities including Chengdu, Hangzhou,  Shanghai, and Shenzhen.

See also
 Conspicuous consumption
 Food safety in China
 Hey Tea
 Luxury goods of China

References

External links
 
 Interview with founder Lin Sheng (Chinese with English subtitles)

Ice cream brands
Dairy products companies of China
Chinese brands
2018 establishments
Companies based in Shanghai